Rika Lesser (born 1953 Brooklyn, New York) is a U.S. poet, and is a translator of Swedish and German literary works.

Life
Lesser earned her bachelor's degree at Yale University in 1974. She studied at the University of Gothenburg in Sweden from 1974 to 1975 and received her MFA from Columbia University in 1977. She has produced three collections of her own poetry, including Etruscan Things (1983), and her prose translations include A Living Soul by P. C. Jersild and Siddhartha by Hermann Hesse.

Awards
In 1982, she was awarded the Landon Poetry Translation Prize from the Academy of American Poets, and received the Poetry Translation Prize of the Swedish Academy in 1996 and in 2003.

Works

Poetry

Translations
 
 Hansel and Gretel (1984) (Illustrated by Paul O. Zelinsky)

References

American translators
Swedish–English translators
German–English translators
Living people
1953 births
American women poets
Literary translators
20th-century American poets
20th-century American women writers
21st-century American women